Demetrius I (died 22 October 232), 12th Bishop and Patriarch of Alexandria. Sextus Julius Africanus, who visited Alexandria in the Bishoprice of Demetrius, places his accession as eleventh bishop from Mark in the tenth year of Roman Emperor Commodus; Eusebius of Caesarea places it in the tenth year of Septimus Severus.

Life
Demetrius was a farmer, who cohabited with his wife as celibates, for 47 years, until he was chosen Patriarch. According to the Synexarium, a biographical collection of the Church's saints, the ailing Patriarch Julian had a vision informing him that his successor would visit him, with a cluster of grapes, while out of season at that time of year. The next day, a farmer named Demetrius arrived with a cluster of grapes for the Bishop, asking for his blessings, and was announced next as Bishop Demetrius I, the twelfth bishop of Alexandria.

Bishop Demetrius was eager to establish a fixed calendar for church fasts and feast days. He established a liturgical calendar by which fast dates were determined. As bishop of the great metropolis, Demetrius was engaged in the controversy over the canonical calculation of Easter. He was the first to apply the calculation method for determining the dates of Easter. His edict was approved by the Nicene Council (325 AD). The Oriental Orthodox churches continue to follow Alexandria.

Jerome claimed that Demetrius sent Pantaenus on a mission to India, it is likely that Clement succeeded Pantaenus as head of the Catechetical School before the patriarchy of Demetrius. When Clement left Alexandria (c. 203), Demetrius appointed Origen, who was in his eighteenth year, as Clement's successor.

Demetrius supported Origen in the beginning of his career, it is said to have admired his scholarship. He dispatched Origen to Arabia, upon an invitation for his visit in letters to the prefect of Alexandria. When the Emperor Caracalla sacked Alexandria in 215 AD, Origen fled to Caesarea, where the Palestinean bishops requested him to give sermons. Demetrius was enraged and wrote to rebuke that his teaching was not canonical for him, as a layman. Bishops Alexander of Jerusalem and Theoctistus of Caesarea wrote in his defense and mentioned precedents for laymen to give sermons, but despite their efforts Demetrius recalled Origen.

In 230, Origen was asked to settle a dispute in Achaea which required his presence, so he set out by way of Palestine. Origen was then ordained priest at Caesarea. When Demetrius learned of this, he considered it an act of emancipation, which deteriorated their relationship. Demetrius convened a synod in 232 that banished Origen, then sent a condemnation of Origen's behavior to all the churches. It is evident, it was personal jealousy not merely non ordination, that have been alleged by Demetrius for such a reaction. Rome accepted the decision, but Caesarea, Phoenicia, Arabia, Achaea disputed it. From Caesarea Origen sent forth letters in his self defence, and attacked Demetrius.

Demetrius then passed Catechetical School under the charge of Heraclas, an assistant of Origen, who had long been his associate. This may have been Demetrius' final act as bishop. Demetrius governed the Church of Alexandria for forty-two years, and died at the age of 105.

Notes

References

2nd-century births
2nd-century Popes and Patriarchs of Alexandria
2nd-century Christian saints
3rd-century Popes and Patriarchs of Alexandria
3rd-century Christian saints
Christian clerical marriage
Saints from Roman Egypt
232 deaths